Osteocephalus sangay, also known as the Sangay casqued tree frog, is a species of frog in the family Hylidae. It is found in eastern Ecuador in Morona Santiago province. O. sangay is in the O. buckleyi species group and is closely related to O. cannatellai.

The Sangay casqued tree frog is named for Sangay National Park, the type locality of the species.

References

Osteocephalus
Amphibians of Ecuador
Amphibians described in 2020
Endemic fauna of Ecuador